Hibbertia angulata is a species of flowering plant in the family Dilleniaceae and is endemic to a restricted area in the Northern Territory. It is an erect sub-shrub with sessile, linear leaves and yellow flowers arranged singly in leaf axils, with seventeen to nineteen stamens arranged in bundles around the three carpels.

Description
Flowering occurs from November to December.

Taxonomy
Hibbertia angulata was first formally described in 2010 by Hellmut R. Toelken in the Journal of the Adelaide Botanic Gardens from specimens collected by Paul Irwin Forster near Berry Springs, Northern Territory in 1989. The specific epithet (angulata) means "angled", referring to the shape of the flower buds.

Distribution and habitat
This hibbertia grows in forest and woodland on the Cox Peninsula west of Darwin in the Northern Territory.

Conservation status
Goodenia angulata is classified as "near threatened" under the Northern Territory Government Territory Parks and Wildlife Conservation Act 1976.

See also
List of Hibbertia species

References

angulata
Flora of the Northern Territory
Plants described in 2010
Taxa named by Hellmut R. Toelken